Insu-dong is a dong, neighbourhood of Gangbuk-gu in Seoul, South Korea. From 30 June 2008, the former Suyu-5 and 6 dong were combined to form this dong.

See also
Administrative divisions of South Korea

References

External links
Gangbuk-gu official website
Gangbuk-gu map at the Gangbuk-gu official website
 Insu-dong resident office website

Neighbourhoods of Gangbuk District